Ramata may refer to:
 Ramata (film), a 2007 feature-length fiction film directed by Léandre-Alain Baker 
 Ramata Airport, an airport on Ramata Island in the Solomon Islands
 Ramata Diakité, a Malian Wassoulou musician
 Ramata Island, an island in  the Solomon Islands
 Ramata parish, an administrative unit of the Valmiera District, Latvia
 Ramatha, a former Roman Catholic titular bishopric in Palestine